People, Hell and Angels is a posthumous compilation album by the American rock musician Jimi Hendrix. The fourth release under the Experience Hendrix deal with Legacy Recordings, it contains twelve previously unreleased recordings of tracks he was working on for the planned follow-up to Electric Ladyland. It was released on March 5, 2013.

Background
The tracks featured on People, Hell and Angels are previously unreleased recordings of songs that Jimi Hendrix and fellow band members (mainly the Band of Gypsys lineup featuring Billy Cox and Buddy Miles) were working on as the follow-up to Electric Ladyland, tentatively titled First Rays of the New Rising Sun. The majority of the recordings are drawn from sessions in 1968 and 1969 at the Record Plant Studios in New York, with a few inclusions from Hendrix's brief residencies at Sound Centre, the Hit Factory, and his own Electric Lady Studios.

Critical reception

People, Hell and Angels received generally positive reviews from critics. At Metacritic, which assigns a normalized rating out of 100 to reviews from mainstream publications, it received an average score of 74, based on 18 reviews. In Rolling Stone, David Fricke said Hendrix "plays at an elevated level in every setting" on the album, while The Wire called the recordings "among the best of Hendrix's late work". Patrick Humphries from BBC Music wrote that it "offers a tantalising glimpse of how Hendrix's genius might have progressed". AllMusic's Sean Westergaard was less enthusiastic and said the album "certainly isn't the place to start your Hendrix collection, but collectors will surely want to hear this". Writing for MSN Music, Robert Christgau called it a quality collection of leftovers highlighted by the songs "Somewhere" and "Let Me Move You", in which Hendrix comps behind saxophonist Lonnie Youngblood.

Track listing

Recording details
Recording details for People, Hell and Angels:

Track 1 recorded on December 19, 1969, at Record Plant Studios
Track 2 recorded on March 13, 1968, at the Sound Centre
Tracks 3, 4 and 12 recorded on May 21, 1969, at Record Plant Studios
Tracks 5 and 10 recorded on March 18, 1969, at Record Plant Studios
Tracks 6 and 7 recorded on August 28, 1969, at the Hit Factory
Track 8 recorded on April 24, 1969, at Record Plant Studios
Track 9 recorded on June 11, 1968, at Record Plant Studios
Track 11 recorded in June 1969, at Fame Studios, Muscle Shoals, Alabama; overdubs in August 1970 at Electric Lady Studios
Track 13 recorded on January 23, 1970, at Record Plant Studios

Personnel

Primary musicians
Jimi Hendrix – guitars, vocals, (bass guitar on track 9)
Billy Cox – bass guitar (tracks 1, 3, 4, 6–8, 13)
Buddy Miles – drums (tracks 1–4, 10, 12, 13)
Mitch Mitchell – drums (tracks 6, 7, 9)
Juma Sultan – congas (tracks 3, 4, 6, 7, 12)

Additional musicians
Larry Lee – rhythm guitar (tracks 6, 7)
Jerry Velez – congas (tracks 6, 7)
Stephen Stills – bass guitar (track 2)
Lonnie Youngblood – vocal & saxophone (track 5)
Rocky Isaac – drums (track 8)
Al Marks – percussion (track 8)
Albert Allen – vocal (track 11)
James Booker – piano (track 11)
Gerry Sack - triangle & mime vocal (track 6)

Charts

Weekly charts

Year-end charts

References

2013 compilation albums
Jimi Hendrix compilation albums
Albums produced by Eddie Kramer
Legacy Recordings compilation albums
Compilation albums published posthumously